is a Japanese manga series by Tomohiro Koizumi. It was adapted into a live action film in 2012.

Cast
 Atsushi Arai as Yukio Akaboshi
 Rino Higa as Shoko Akaboshi
 Ryousuke Kawamura as Atsushi Omoi
 Shintarō Akutsu as Yuuki Yashiro
 Ryō Shihono as Akane Aoki
 Airi Nakajima as Aoi Sakurai
 Takuya Nagaoka as Naoki Gotou
 Aya Enjouji as Meiko Akaboshi
 Susumu Kobayashi as Hiroshi Akaboshi

Reception
In a list of "10 Great Zombie Manga", Anime News Network's Jason Thompson placed Life Is Dead in sixth place.

References

External links

2007 manga
Futabasha manga
Manga adapted into films
Seinen manga
Zombies in anime and manga
Japanese horror films